The Palace of Peace and Reconciliation (Beibıtşılık pen kelısım saraiy), also translated as the Pyramid of Peace and Accord, is a  pyramid in Astana, the capital of Kazakhstan, since 2019, that serves as a non-denominational national spiritual centre and event venue. Designed by architectural practice Foster and Partners, and surmounted by a modern stained glass apex by architectural artist Brian Clarke, the Palace was constructed to house the triennial Congress of Leaders of World and Traditional Religions, and completed in 2006.

History 

Built by Sembol Construction at a cost of 8.74 billion Kazakh tenge (approx. $58 million), the project was conceived as a permanent venue for the Congress of Leaders of World and Traditional Religions, which meets triennially in a purpose-built conference chamber at the apex of the pyramid. In 2011 and 2013, the International Astana Action Film Festival was held in the Palace.

Building 

The pyramid portion of the building is 62 metres high and sits on a   earth-covered block. All of this construction is above ground level. Though the landscaping of the Presidential Park rises up to cover the lower levels, these are not in fact basements.

The structure is made up of five "stories" of triangles, each of which is 12 m per side. The lower portions, three "stories" of triangles, are clad in pale granite. The upper two rows of triangles, four triangles per side, are clad in 9700 square feet of stained glass, an artwork by architectural artist Brian Clarke which forms the glazed apex, and incorporates ceramic glaze screen-printed imagery of doves in flight, as do the twenty eight diamond-shaped stained glass windows on the four sides of the lower level of the building, which total 1076 square feet.

Construction is of a steel frame for the pyramid and concrete for the lower levels.  The engineers had to design the building to withstand expansion and contraction due to temperature variations of over 80 °C, from -40 to over 40 °C - leading to an expansion of the building of up to 30 cm. Due to the extreme climate of the city, the engineers locked down one corner of the pyramid, and placed the three other corners on bridge bearings, a common technique for building bridges, but used in a building for the first time.

The Pyramid contains accommodations for different religions: Judaism, Islam, Christianity, Buddhism, Hinduism, Daoism and other faiths. It also houses a 1,300-seat opera house, a national museum of culture, a new "university of civilization", a library and a research center for Kazakhstan's ethnic and geographical groups. This diversity is unified within the pure form of a pyramid, 62 m (203 ft) high with a 62x62m (203x203ft) base. The building is conceived as a global center for religious understanding, the renunciation of violence and the promotion of faith and human equality.

The Pyramid of Peace expresses the spirit of Kazakhstan, where cultures, traditions and representatives of various nationalities coexist in peace, harmony and accord. Bathed in the golden and pale blue glow of the stained glass (colors taken from the Kazakhstan flag), 200 delegates from the world's main religions and faiths will meet every three years in a circular chamber based on the United Nations Security Council meeting room in New York.

The building was designed by the British architects Foster and Partners (lead design). Turkish architectural firm Tabanlıoğlu Architects undertook construction information packages for the Foster design and engineers Buro Happold undertook lead structural and services design. The Foster team was led by architects Nigel Dancey, Peter Ridley and Lee Hallman. Sembol Construction undertook a Design and Build contract, and were ultimately responsible for the final details and finishes, some of which varied considerably from the Foster and Tabanlıoğlu (Tabanlioglu) intent. Auditorium and performance equipment design was by Anne Minors Performance Consultants and acoustics by Sound Space Design.

Gallery

See also 

 Congress of Leaders of World and Traditional Religions

References

External links
 Official Website Congress of Leaders of World and Traditional Religions 
 Official Website of Palace of Peace and Reconciliation
  Anne Minors Performance Consultants - project theatre consultant
  Sound Space Design, project acoustics consultant
 Hugh Pearman, "Gabion: The pyramid of peace: Norman Foster assumes the monumental mantle of Boullée. In Kazakhstan", expanded version of original story in The Sunday Times (London), February 20 2005, on hughperman.com
Hugh  Pearman, "Architecture: One steppe beyond", The Times (London), September 3, 2006
 "Pyramid puts President on map", The Times (London), October 17, 2006
  "Foster completes in Kazakhstan", World Architecture News, September 4, 2006

Foster and Partners buildings
Opera houses in Kazakhstan
Music venues in Kazakhstan
Theatres in Kazakhstan
Buildings and structures in Astana
Buildings and structures completed in 2006
Pyramids in Asia
Event venues established in 2006
2006 establishments in Kazakhstan
Tourist attractions in Astana
Works by Brian Clarke